
Gmina Krasnobród is an urban-rural gmina (administrative district) in Zamość County, Lublin Voivodeship, in eastern Poland.

The gmina contains part of the protected area called Krasnobród Landscape Park.

Villages
Apart from the town of Krasnobród, Gmina Krasnobród contains the villages and settlements of Dominikanówka, Grabnik, Hucisko, Hutki, Hutków, Kaczórki, Majdan Mały, Majdan Wielki, Malewszczyzna, Nowa Wieś, Podklasztor, Stara Huta, Wólka Husińska and Zielone.

Neighbouring gminas
Gmina Krasnobród is bordered by the gminas of Adamów, Józefów, Krynice, Susiec, Tarnawatka, Tomaszów Lubelski and Zwierzyniec.

References

Polish official population figures 2006

Krasnobrod
Zamość County